Zamienie  is a village in Gmina Mińsk Mazowiecki, Mińsk County, Masovian Voivodeship, Poland.

References

Villages in Mińsk County